Sarah Anne Inserra (born December 31, 1986) is an American soccer player from Colorado Springs, Colorado who plays for the Colorado Rush of the United Soccer Leagues' W-League. She was a defender for the Florida State Seminoles and the United States U-20 women's national soccer team.

After a short stint on the roster of the Women's Professional Soccer club, the Chicago Red Stars in 2009, Wagenfuhr played for the Buffalo Flash of the W-League.  With the Flash, Wagenfuhr logged 1,170 minutes in the midfield, notching a goal and two assists in her time with the club.

In 2010, the Saint Louis Athletica picked up Wagenfuhr as a free agent.  She suffered a hamstring injury in the season opener against the Red Stars, which cut short (23 minutes) what turned out to be her only match played with the green and blue. On June 1, 2010, Wagenfuhr again became a free agent upon the dissolution of the Athletica.

She later signed with the Littleton, Colorado-based Colorado Rush of the W-League, the second tier of American women's soccer.  Wagenfuhr assisted on the game-winning goal in the expansion side's first ever victory, a 2–0 triumph over the Santa Clarita Blue Heat on June 24, 2010. She continued on to teach at Florida State University Schools as an English teacher.

She married Todd Inserra on August 20, 2011.

References

External links

Florida State player page
 Colorado Rush Player Profile

Florida State Seminoles women's soccer players
Living people
1986 births
American women's soccer players
Saint Louis Athletica players
Chicago Red Stars players
USL W-League (1995–2015) players
Women's association football defenders
United States women's under-20 international soccer players
Women's Professional Soccer players